"Cry for Me" (stylized in all caps) is a song recorded by South Korean girl group Twice. The song was released by JYP Entertainment on December 18, 2020.

Background and release 
On December 6, 2020, Twice revealed and performed for the first time the song during the 2020 Mnet Asian Music Awards. In a 2022 documentary released by Mnet, Jihyo said that their agency, JYP Entertainment, was hesitating to release "Cry for Me" and let Twice perform it at the 2020 Mnet Asian Music Awards.

On December 7, JYP Entertainment announced the release of the song via Twice's Twitter account. Three days later, JYPE announced the date of the release of the song on December 18 with a new teaser image as well as the date of the concept photo for the song. On December 14, the concept film for "Cry for Me" was uploaded on JYP Entertainment's YouTube channel. One day later, the first concept photos of members Momo and Mina were revealed. On December 16, JYPE released the concept photos of Dahyun and Jihyo. Then followed the concept photos of members Sana and Tzuyu on December 17. Finally, the last concept photos of Chaeyoung and Nayeon were revealed on December 18. Jeongyeon's concept photo was never revealed as she was on hiatus due to her anxiety.

"Cry for Me" was released on December 18, 2020, for digital download and streaming in various countries.

English  and Japanese versions

English version 
The English version of "Cry for Me" was released on June 11, 2021, as the seventh track of the physical edition of Twice's tenth extended play Taste of Love.

Japanese version 
Twice released the fourth compilation album #Twice4,  on March 16, 2022,  which includes both Korean and Japanese-language versions of "Cry for Me". The Japanese lyrics were written by Risa Horie.

Live performances 
Twice appeared and performed "Cry for Me" on The Kelly Clarkson Show on April 28, 2021.

Composition 
"Cry for Me" is written in the key of B-flat major and has a fast tempo of 145 beats per minute, with most of the song following a Cm—F—B♭—D7 chord progression. It runs for a length of three minutes and 24 seconds. Lyrically, it describes a toxic love-hate relationship. It was written by Park Jin-young (J.Y. Park) and Heize, Ryan Tedder, Melanie Joy Fontana, Michel "Lindgren" Schulz and A Wright and was arranged by Lindgren.

Credits and personnel 
Credits adapted from Tidal.

 Twice – lead vocals
 Park Jin-young – lyricist
 Heize – lyricist
 A Wright – composer
 Melanie Joy Fontana – composer
 Michel "Lindgren" Schulz – composer
 Ryan Tedder – composer
 Heidi Wang – assistant mixing manager
 Sophia Pae – backing vocals, vocal arranger
 Chris Gehringer – mastering engineer
 Kwon Nam-woo – mastering engineer
 Lee Sang-yeop – recording engineer
 Josh Gudwin – mixing engineer
 Lee Tae-sub – mixing engineer
 Lee Sang-yeop – recording engineer
 Jiyoung Shin NYC – sound editor
 Armadillo – vocal arranger

Charts

Release history

References 

2020 singles
2020 songs
Korean-language songs
Twice (group) songs
JYP Entertainment singles
Republic Records singles
Songs written by Park Jin-young
Songs written by Ryan Tedder
Songs written by Melanie Fontana